Notes from the Underground is the debut album by experimental jazz fusion trio Medeski Martin & Wood.

Track listing
"Hermeto's Daydream" (John Medeski, Billy Martin) – 7:11
"The Saint" (Medeski) – 6:58
"La Garonne" (Medeski) – 5:51
"Orbits" (Wayne Shorter) – 4:25
"Uncle Chubb" (Medeski, Martin, Wood) – 7:04
"Rebirth" (Medeski, Martin, Wood) – 6:28
"Otis" (Medeski) – 4:44
"United" (W. Shorter) – 8:29
"Caravan" (Duke Ellington, Juan Tizol, Irving Mills) – 8:18
"Querencia" (Medeski) – 12:48

Performers
John Medeski – piano
Billy Martin – drums, percussion
Chris Wood – acoustic bass
Steven Bernstein – trumpet
Bill Lowe – tuba, trombone
Curtis Hasselbring – trombone
Thomas Chapin – alto saxophone, alto flute
Doug Yates – bass clarinet

Credits
Horn arrangements by John Medeski
Recorded by David Baker and Roger Teltzman
Mixed by David Baker and John Siket at Sound on Sound, NYC
Edited by Bob Ferapples
Mastering by Bob Appel
All trio recordings live to DAT
Photos: Alan Martin
Cover art ("Balafon") and covie design: Billy Martin

1992 debut albums
Medeski Martin & Wood albums
Gramavision Records albums